Traveller Book 6: Scouts is a tabletop role-playing game supplement, written by Marc Miller for Traveller, and published by Game Designers' Workshop in  1983. Scouts deals with expanded character generation systems for Traveller'''s Scout Service, and an expanded world generation system. The Scout Service is fictional intersteller exploration organization.

An updated edition titled Book 3 Scout, written by Lawrence Whitaker, was published by Mongoose Publishing in 2009.

Reception
Tony Watson reviewed Scouts in Ares Magazine #17 and commented that "Scouts adds much to Scout characters and especially to the generation of star systems and worlds. These latter rules and great detail to star systems, and a correspondingly greater cost in time and effort to create subsectors. Its value then, depends on how anxious the referee is to include the new information in his campaign."
 
Andy Slack reviewed Scouts for White Dwarf #53, giving the supplement 7/10 overall and stated that it was "Not as clear as earlier Traveller materials. If you want to generate or GM detailed Traveller star-systems, and have a lot of time to spare, this is the item for you. If you simply want expanded scout characters, then egotism aside Star Patrol is similar and cheaper."

Stephen Nutt reviewed Scouts, Book 6 for Imagine magazine, and stated that "It is hard to say that GDW have done more than half succeed with this one."

Reviews
 Different Worlds'' #41 (Jan/Feb 1986)

See also
Classic Traveller Books

References

Role-playing game supplements introduced in 1983
Traveller (role-playing game) supplements